Matthew Hogg (born 21 December 1968) is a former Australian rules footballer who played for Footscray and Carlton.

Hogg started his career at Footscray after being recruited from East Keilor. Carlton then picked up Hogg at pick 18 in the 1991 National Draft. He usually played as a tagger for the Blues, and at the peak of his abilities in the mid-1990s he was considered one of the best attacking taggers in the league; but was also known to spend time in the back pocket. He was a member of Carlton's 1995 premiership team; although he had been injured throughout most of Carlton's record-breaking 1995 season, missing the first 21 games after having foot surgery, he returned in the final round and played all three finals to earn the premiership medallion. He represented Victoria 1994 in State of Origin against South Australia. In 1996 he won the Best Clubman Award for the Blues.

Hogg injured a hand against Port Adelaide in an early game of 1999, and he spent much of the season in the reserves.  The AFL Record published an article about Hogg in its Round 22 edition, reflecting on Hogg's career and how it would come to an anticlimactic conclusion that week in the reserves' final game; the article would prove to be embarrassingly inaccurate. Hogg was called up from the emergency list at the last minute to play against Richmond at the MCG that week (the game best remembered for the Ponsford Stand scoreboard catching fire), and would go on to play in Carlton's semi-final win against West Coast, played a vital tagging role in the memorable one-point victory against Essendon in the preliminary final, and the Grand Final loss against the Kangaroos.

Hogg played 59 games for Footscray with 4 goals, and 114 games for Carlton with 38 goals. He is a life member of the Carlton Football Club.

Statistics

|-
|- style="background-color: #EAEAEA"
! scope="row" style="text-align:center" | 1988
|style="text-align:center;"|
| 43 || 14 || 0 || 3 || 127 || 32 || 159 || 27 || 18 || 0.0 || 0.2 || 9.1 || 2.3 || 11.4 || 1.9 || 1.3 || 0
|-
! scope="row" style="text-align:center" | 1989
|style="text-align:center;"|
| 43 || 21 || 2 || 2 || 228 || 69 || 297 || 60 || 51 || 0.1 || 0.1 || 10.9 || 3.3 || 14.1 || 2.9 || 2.4 || 1
|- style="background-color: #EAEAEA"
! scope="row" style="text-align:center" | 1990
|style="text-align:center;"|
| 43 || 14 || 2 || 1 || 109 || 71 || 180 || 31 || 22 || 0.1 || 0.1 || 7.8 || 5.1 || 12.9 || 2.2 || 1.6 || 2
|-
! scope="row" style="text-align:center" | 1991
|style="text-align:center;"|
| 43 || 10 || 0 || 0 || 69 || 39 || 108 || 18 || 10 || 0.0 || 0.0 || 6.9 || 3.9 || 10.8 || 1.8 || 1.0 || 0
|- style="background-color: #EAEAEA"
! scope="row" style="text-align:center" | 1992
|style="text-align:center;"|
| 33 || 17 || 6 || 3 || 133 || 54 || 187 || 24 || 28 || 0.4 || 0.2 || 7.8 || 3.2 || 11.0 || 1.4 || 1.6 || 4
|-
! scope="row" style="text-align:center" | 1993
|style="text-align:center;"|
| 33 || 19 || 4 || 6 || 159 || 80 || 239 || 45 || 45 || 0.2 || 0.3 || 8.4 || 4.2 || 12.6 || 2.4 || 2.4 || 0
|- style="background-color: #EAEAEA"
! scope="row" style="text-align:center" | 1994
|style="text-align:center;"|
| 33 || 24 || 16 || 16 || 202 || 167 || 369 || 62 || 58 || 0.7 || 0.7 || 8.4 || 7.0 || 15.4 || 2.6 || 2.4 || 1
|-
|style="text-align:center;background:#afe6ba;"|1995†
|style="text-align:center;"|
| 33 || 4 || 0 || 1 || 30 || 5 || 35 || 10 || 4 || 0.0 || 0.3 || 7.5 || 1.3 || 8.8 || 2.5 || 1.0 || 0
|- style="background-color: #EAEAEA"
! scope="row" style="text-align:center" | 1996
|style="text-align:center;"|
| 33 || 11 || 2 || 0 || 82 || 52 || 134 || 23 || 11 || 0.2 || 0.0 || 7.5 || 4.7 || 12.2 || 2.1 || 1.0 || 0
|-
! scope="row" style="text-align:center" | 1997
|style="text-align:center;"|
| 33 || 18 || 6 || 2 || 137 || 68 || 205 || 46 || 22 || 0.3 || 0.1 || 7.6 || 3.8 || 11.4 || 2.6 || 1.2 || 0
|- style="background-color: #EAEAEA"
! scope="row" style="text-align:center" | 1998
|style="text-align:center;"|
| 33 || 14 || 3 || 4 || 103 || 53 || 156 || 26 || 23 || 0.2 || 0.3 || 7.4 || 3.8 || 11.1 || 1.9 || 1.6 || 0
|-
! scope="row" style="text-align:center" | 1999
|style="text-align:center;"|
| 33 || 7 || 1 || 1 || 23 || 9 || 32 || 5 || 4 || 0.1 || 0.1 || 3.3 || 1.3 || 4.6 || 0.7 || 0.6 || 0
|- class="sortbottom"
! colspan=3| Career
! 173
! 42
! 39
! 1402
! 699
! 2101
! 377
! 296
! 0.2
! 0.2
! 8.1
! 4.0
! 12.1
! 2.2
! 1.7
! 8
|}

References

External links
Blueseum Profile

1968 births
Living people
Carlton Football Club players
Carlton Football Club Premiership players
Western Bulldogs players
Australian rules footballers from Victoria (Australia)
Victorian State of Origin players
One-time VFL/AFL Premiership players